The Lookingglass Formation is a geologic formation in Oregon. It preserves fossils dating back to the Paleogene period.

See also 
 List of fossiliferous stratigraphic units in Oregon
 Paleontology in Oregon

References 

Paleogene geology of Oregon
Formations